Renée Scheltema is a Dutch documentary filmmaker and photographer, living in Cape Town, South Africa. She has been making documentaries for 35 years.

After her Bachelors at Law, and Doctorandus degree in Criminology, she received her Masters at the School of Journalism at the University of California in Berkeley. Her main subjects were TV journalism and photojournalism.

In 2019 the new updated version of Normal Is Over The Movie 1.1 was completed, as the message of this independent award-winning documentary, is becoming more relevant by the day.

Normal Is Over has its focus on humanity's wisest response to climate change, species extinction, resource depletion, income inequality, and the link between these issues. COVID19 is also a symptom of ecosystem degradation. This independent film investigates the financial and economical paradigm underlying our planetary problems. It is a globe- trotting journey searching for SOLUTIONS to reverse the path of global decline.

Funding for the updated version has been provided by The New Normal Foundation.

In August 2015, after 4 years of working as a one-woman-film-crew, Scheltema completed the previous 120-minute feature version of the film Normal Is Over The Movie, which was self-financed.

Normal is Over received the Grand Educational Award, Cine Eco Film Festival, Best in Show Award, Cinema Verde Film Festival, and the Honorable Mention Award, Tasmanian Eco Film Festival.  It was selected to screen at 13 film festivals, like the Wild & Scenic Film Festival USA; Princeton International Film Festival; The Santa Cruz Film Festival; Environmental Film Festival Spain; Greenmotions Film Fest, Germany. South African Eco Film Festival; Sonoma International Film Festival, USA.

For many years, Scheltema worked for Dutch television as a documentary film director, producer, camera person and editor: NOS International Affairs Programme. NOS, NCRV, AVRO, Human TV, TROS, Veronica, IKON, VPRO, and the BOS, Buddhist Broadcasting Station. 
Many documentaries were co-productions with TV and Non-governmental organizations SNV, UNDP, UNESCO, Amnesty International. Renée has always been focusing on social issues, sustainable development, art and the protection of the environment.

Her art series "Canvas Extreme" consists of seven 30-minute portraits of cutting-edge artists filmed during the Mandela era in South Africa, and was sold to TV stations in France, Spain, Mexico, Switzerland, and the Netherlands.

Other documentaries include Happy in Zimbabwe?, Portrait of a Zen couple, and Een Gezelig Gesprek, Portrait of Nicolaas Pierson.

Scheltema's 2009 award-winning feature documentary Something Unknown Is Doing We Don't Know What investigates the science behind psychic experiences, featuring top scientists in the US, such as Prof. Charles Tart, Dr. Dean Radin, Dr. Rupert Sheldrake, and Hal Puthoff. This film has been selected at many film festivals, and has been distributed worldwide. Renée also wrote a book called Something Unknown which is available on Amazon. The book has been translated in Dutch, called "Iets Bekends Doet Iets Onverwachts".

Film festivals for Normal is Over The Movie 1.1: New Version, ©2019
Normal Is Over The Movie 1.1
Fragments Film Festival. June 2019. London, UK

Film festivals for Normal is Over, First version ©2015
Normal Is Over, First version
Cinema Verde Environmental Film Festival Florida, Oct. 2016: Best in Show Award
Tasmanian Eco Film Festival, 2016: Honorable Mention Award
Official Selection Cine Eco Film Festival Portugal, Oct. 2016: Grand Environmental Education Prize
Official Selection Sonoma International Film Festival, April 2017
Official Selection South African Eco Film Festival, March 2017
Official Selection Wild and Scenic Film Festival California, Jan 2016
Official Selection International Environmental Film Festival Spain
Official Selection Princeton Independent Film Festival
Official Selection Green Motion Film Festival, Germany, Nov. 2016
Official Selection Film festival Freiburg, Nov. 2016
Official Selection International Kuala Lumpur Eco Festival. October 2016
Official Selection IMFF Rostov, Russia, Aug. 2016
Official Selection Santa Cruz Film Festival, June 2016

Film festivals for Something Unknown Is Doing We Don't Know What
Something Unknown Is Doing We Don't Know What
Arizona International Film Festival. April 2009:  Special Jury Award for feature documentary
Santa Fe Film Festival
Globians Doc Fest Berlin, August 2009
The Feel Good Film Festival, Los Angeles 
Spirit Quest Film Festival, Edinboro University of Pennsylvania.
Silk City Film Festival. SilkCityFlickFest.com is for sale
Durban International Film Festival, South Africa. 2010
Cosmic Cine Festival. 2012. Germany, Cosmic Cine

Hush, a portrait of artist Tracy Payne
Asolo Art Filmfestival, 2001
International Festival for Woman Films, Paris, 2000

Other films
 “Seven Days in Burma” a co-production with TV and UNDP and  UNESCO, Festival: *Donostia (Spain)
 “The Death Penalty”, a coproduction with TV and  Amnesty International, Festival: *Monte Carlo
 “The Bus”, with WWF-Table Mountain Fund and the National Botanical Gardens in South Africa. Festival: *WSSD filmfestival Johannesburg, 2002:
 "A Zen couple in the Western Cape". Festival: *European TV Festival of Rel.Progr.Norway.

Photography
Scheltema is a professional photographer and has been working for magazines and newspapers in the Netherlands, the United States, and South Africa. She was a member of Gamma Liaison in New York City (now called Getty Images).

Exhibition: "More than Clogs and Tulips" a portrait of filmmaker Theo Van Gogh.
A unique collection of photographic moments. Presented by the Dutch Consulate in Cape Town. 2008.

Exhibition: Streetkids in Cape Town. Curated by The Homestead

Degrees
Bachelor at Law. University of Leiden. Netherlands
Drs. Criminology. University of Leiden. Netherlands
M.A. School of Journalism. University of California in Berkeley. USA

References

Normal is Over The Movie: Home - Normalisover.org
Foundation: http://www.thenewnormalfoundation.org/

External links

1951 births
Living people
Dutch film directors
Dutch women film directors
Dutch documentary filmmakers
Dutch documentary film directors
Dutch documentary film producers
Dutch photographers
Leiden University alumni
University of California, Berkeley alumni
People from Bergen, North Holland
Women documentary filmmakers